Elisenda may refer to:

In people
 Elisenda Fábregas (b. 1955), Spanish/American composer
 Elisenda Grigsby, American mathematician
 Elisenda of Montcada (c. 1292 – 19 June 1364) was queen consort of Aragon
 Elisenda Paluzie (b. 1969), Spanish economist, politician, and professor
 Elisenda Pérez (b. 1975), Spanish swimmer
 Elisenda de Sant Climent (1220–1275), Catalan slave
 Elisenda Vives Balmaña, Andorran diplomat

In other
 Reina Elisenda (Barcelona–Vallès Line), railway station on the Barcelona–Vallès Line, in Sarrià, in the Sarrià-Sant Gervasi district of Barcelona, Spain